The Stone Quarry (formerly Cruel and Unusual Films, Inc.) is an American production company established in 2004 by filmmaker Zack Snyder, his wife Deborah Snyder and their producing partner Wesley Coller.

Establishment

Cruel and Unusual Films, Inc. was founded in 2004 by Zack Snyder, his wife Deborah Snyder, and producing partner Wesley Coller.  The company is based at Warner Bros., and is located in Pasadena, California. The company signed a two-year production deal with Warner Bros. in 2007, prior to the theatrical release of 300, a film in which Snyder served as director. Snyder and his wife, Deborah, are co-presidents of the company. Coller often serves as a producing partner. Snyder launched the company's official website on January 30, 2009, and invited artists to submit versions of the company logo. Apart from producing feature films, Cruel and Unusual Films has also assisted in the marketing of its films, based on the strong advertising backgrounds of Snyder and his wife, Deborah Snyder. By January 2019, Snyder announced the studio's new title, The Stone Quarry.

Background
To date, Cruel and Unusual/The Stone Quarry has served as an uncredited co-producer for films in which Snyder and his wife served as director and producer respectively. Following its establishment in 2004, the company produced Dawn of the Dead, a remake of George A. Romero's 1978 film of the same name. In 2007, Cruel and Unusual Films produced 300, an adaptation of Frank Miller's graphic novel. In 2009, the company produced Watchmen, an adaptation of the DC Comics limited series of the same name. Cruel and Unusual next produced Legend of the Guardians: The Owls of Ga'Hoole, a computer-animated film based on the series of children's fantasy books Guardians of Ga'Hoole by Kathryn Lasky. Sucker Punch was co-written and directed by Snyder, who also produced the film with his wife Deborah Snyder. The film is the first that credits Cruel and Unusual as a producer. Sucker Punch was released on March 25, 2011.

In 2014 the studio co-produced the sequel to 2007's 300, 300: Rise of an Empire. In 2016 the studio co-produced the sequel to 2013's Man of Steel, Batman v Superman: Dawn of Justice.

In 2017 the studio co-produced Wonder Woman and Justice League.

In July 2015 it was revealed that Zack Snyder and Deborah Snyder will serve as producers and executive producers in the DC Extended Universe. Since 2018, DC Films chairmen Geoff Johns and Walter Hamada will serve as executive producer on the future DC movies set in the DC Extended Universe, along with the Snyders.

The studio was supposed to produce Army of the Dead, a sequel to Snyder's Dawn of the Dead remake, in which Zack Snyder was supposed to assist in developing the story, while his wife to produce the film, and Joby Harold to write the screenplay. The story centers around a father trying to save his daughter in a zombie-infested Las Vegas. Due to the expensive production value, the production of the movie was cancelled by Warner Bros.

Future projects
Zack Snyder will also direct a remake of the 1969 film The Illustrated Man. 
The company will also produce Horse Latitudes, which was formerly known as The Last Photograph, a film about a photograph that inspires two men to travel to South America. The film will be directed by Zack Snyder and will be produced by Snyder and his wife Deborah Snyder.

In September 2017, it was confirmed that Zack Snyder is developing The Fountainhead adaptation, based on the 1943 novel from Ayn Rand.

On January 29, 2019, Snyder announced that he had signed on to direct Army of the Dead, a zombie horror thriller, for Netflix. Snyder would also produce with Deborah Snyder.

On May 20, 2020, Snyder officially announced that Warner Bros. would be releasing his cut of Justice League as Zack Snyder's Justice League on HBO Max in 2021.

In September 2020, it was announced that Netflix had greenlit a prequel based on Army of the Dead, with Matthias Schweighöfer set to direct the film in addition to reprising his role as Ludwig. Shay Hatten will also pen the screenplay. It was also announced that an anime prequel series was in the works titled Army of the Dead: Lost Vegas. The series will serve as an origin story for Dave Bautista's character Scott Ward and his rescue team during the initial fall of Vegas as they confront the source of the zombie outbreak. Jay Oliva is set to serve as showrunner for the series, with both Oliva and Zack Snyder set to direct two episodes each. In July 2021, the company signed a first-look deal with Netflix.

Productions

Films

Television

Video games

References

External links
 

 
American companies established in 2004
Film production companies of the United States
Companies based in Pasadena, California
2004 establishments in California